Werner II of Habsburg (died 19 August 1167) was Count of Habsburg also called Werner III and a progenitor of the royal House of Habsburg. He was the great-great-grandfather of King Rudolph I of Germany.

He was the son of Count Otto II of Habsburg and Hilla of Pfirt. Werner married Ida of Homberg. He is known for having been involved in the War of Bregenz Succession of 1164 – 1166.

He died near Tusculum after the Battle of Monte Porzio.

He was the father of Count Albert III of Habsburg and Bishop Otto II of Constance (1165–1174). His daughter Richenza married Count Louis I of Pfirt.

References
 Entry at worldroots
 Entry at GenMa

12th-century births
1167 deaths
Year of birth unknown
Counts of Habsburg